Julia Shammas Holter (born December 18, 1984) is an American singer-songwriter, record producer, composer, artist and academic, based in Los Angeles. Following three independent album productions, Holter released Tragedy as her first official studio album in 2011. Ekstasis followed in 2012. After signing with Domino Records in 2013, she released the albums Loud City Song (2013), Have You in My Wilderness (2015) and the live-in-the-studio album In the Same Room (2017). Most recently, her double album Aviary was released in 2018.

Holter has also collaborated with other musicians, including Nite Jewel, Laurel Halo, Ariel Pink, Ducktails, Linda Perhacs, Michael Pisaro, and Jean-Michel Jarre.

Biography
Holter was born in Milwaukee, Wisconsin. At age six her family moved to Los Angeles, where she later attended the Alexander Hamilton High School. She studied music at The University of Michigan for four years, graduating with a degree in composition. After seeing Michael Pisaro perform an avant-garde composition in Michigan, she was inspired to study with him at CalArts, where she graduated from another composition program.
Holter contributed songs to multiple compilation albums in 2008. In 2010, she began playing with Linda Perhacs' band and released a CD-R titled Celebration and a collection of live recordings.

Following three independently produced albums – Phaedra Runs to Russia (2007), Cookbook (2008) and Celebration (2010), Holter's official debut album, Tragedy, was released in August 2011 on Leaving Records. Inspired by Euripides' Greek play Hippolytus, 
the album received generally favorable reviews and was named one of NPR's "Best Outer Sound Albums of 2011".

Holter released her second album, Ekstasis, in March 2012 on the RVNG Intl. label. The album drew comparisons to works by such artists as Laurie Anderson, Julianna Barwick, Kate Bush, Joanna Newsom, Grouper, and Stereolab, and received many positive reviews. 
Holter spent three years making the album, whose title comes from the Greek word meaning "outside of oneself." 
The music video for album track "Moni Mon Amie", directed by Yelena Zhelezov, was also released in March.

In addition to collaborating with other California-based musicians like Nite Jewel (Ramona Gonzalez), Holter released her third album, Loud City Song, in August 2013 on Domino Records. Unlike her preceding albums, which were recorded mostly alone in her bedroom, Holter recorded Loud City Song  with an ensemble of musicians.

In 2015, Holter released the album Have You in My Wilderness, which became her most successful charting release to date. She also contributed to Ducktails' fifth studio album, St. Catherine, with her bandmates Chris Votek and Andrew Tholl.

Holter collaborated with Jean-Michel Jarre on a song for the second part of the Electronica double album, released on July 18, 2016.

In November 2016, she curated her own program during the tenth anniversary edition of Le Guess Who? Festival in Utrecht. This program included performances by Laurel Halo, Josephine Foster, Maya Dunietz, Jessica Moss and other artists.

In September 2017, she performed a world premier of her scoring of the 1928 silent French film The Passion of Joan of Arc on September 29 at the FIGat7th in downtown Los Angeles.

In September 2018, Holter announced her fifth commercially released album, Aviary, and released the lead single "I Shall Love 2". She followed it with another single, "Words I Heard", before the album's release on October 26.

In 2021, Holter was appointed the Johnston-Fix Professor of the Practice in Songwriting; Visiting Assistant Professor at Occidental College in Los Angeles.

Style
The Guardian wrote that "Holter's vocal register [...] faintly recalls Siouxsie Sioux or Nico". Under the Radar similarly compared her to other female artists saying; "Holter is Siouxsie Sioux meets Kate Bush, with a matchstick intensity, relighting her own wick by the conversation in her voice, her diaphragm shifting between instruments".

Personal life
Holter was previously in a relationship with former Real Estate guitarist and Ducktails frontman Matt Mondanile. In 2015, she contributed to his Ducktails album, St. Catherine. In the wake of sexual misconduct allegations made against Mondanile, Holter divulged that Mondanile was "emotionally abusive to the point where I had to have a lawyer intervene and was afraid for my life."

Discography

Studio albums

Live albums

Singles 

 "Maria" (2011)
 "Marienbad" (2012)
 "In the Same Room" (2012)
 "Goddess Eyes" (2012)
 "World" (2013)
 "In The Green Wild" (2013)
 "Maxims I" (2013)
 "Don't Make Me Over" (2014)
 "Feel You" (2015)
 "Sea Calls Me Home" (2015)
 "Condemnation", with Romona Gonzalez and Nedelle Torissi (2017)
 "I Shall Love 2" (2018)
 "Words I Heard" (2018)
 "Les Jeux to You - Edit" (2019)
 "Gold Dust Woman" (2020)
 "So Humble the Afternoon" (2020)
 "Heloise", with Harper Simon and Meditations On Crime, feat. Geologist (2022)

Remixes by Julia Holter 
 "Strange Town" by Buzzy Lee (2021)

References

External links
 
 Live from NYC's Le Poisson Rouge on NPR
 Julia Holter Julia Holter 
 Julia Holter by Ben Vida Bomb

American electronic musicians
American indie pop musicians
Avant-garde keyboardists
California Institute of the Arts alumni
Living people
Singers from Los Angeles
Songwriters from California
1984 births
American women in electronic music
Domino Recording Company artists
University of Michigan School of Music, Theatre & Dance alumni
21st-century American women singers
Musicians from Milwaukee
21st-century American singers